A partridge is an Old World bird in the pheasant family.

Partridge may also refer to:

Entertainment
Alan Partridge, fictional British television and radio presenter
The Partridge Family, American TV musical-sitcom

Places
 Partridge, Kansas, United States
 Partridge Island (disambiguation), multiple locations
 John Partridge House, historic house in Millis, Massachusetts

Plants
Partridge Berry, Mitchella repens, wildflower growing in the eastern United States
Partridge Pea, Chamaecrista fasciculata, wildflower growing in the eastern United States

Other uses
Partridge (surname), including a list of people with the name
Partridge Jewellers, New Zealand luxury jewellery retailer
19810 Partridge, main-belt asteroid
HMS Partridge, Royal Navy ships which have borne this name

See also 
 Partridge River (disambiguation)